Jin Suo Ji (aka The Golden Cangue or The Golden Chain) is a 1950 Hong Kong film written by Eileen Chang and directed by Shu-Sun Chiu. The story is based on Chang's 1943 novella of the same name.

Plot 
The story revolves around a powerless daughter-in-law named Cao Qiqiao who suffers abuse for years from her stern mother-in-law, who ridicules Cao Qiqiao for being from a lower station. When she becomes a mother-in-law herself, however, she continues to perpetuate the cycle.

Cast 

 Shia Jung

References 

Hong Kong drama films
1950 films